"Cradle of Love" is a rock song written by Billy Idol and David Werner for Idol's 1990 fourth studio album Charmed Life. The song is the album's sixth track and was released as its first single. "Cradle of Love" became one of Idol's biggest hits and his 4th and last top 10 hit in the United States, where it reached  2 on the Billboard Hot 100. It was also Idol's first and only No. 1 hit on the Billboard Mainstream Rock Tracks chart. On the UK Single Chart, it stalled at No. 34.

Music and lyrics
"Cradle of Love" is a rock song composed in common time and in the key of B major. The song title is supposedly based on the saying "robbing the cradle". However, this title appears to have been inspired directly from the John Lennon penned song, "Cookin' (In the Kitchen of Love) which he performed piano and sung back up vocals with his former Beatles band mate, Ringo Starr on Ringo's album "Ringo's Rotogravure." So it's extremely likely, and highly possible that Billy Idol's "Rockin' the Cradle of Love" was actually inspired by the Ringo Starr song, "Cookin' (In the Kitchen of Love)" ]]."

Music video

The video, directed by David Fincher, features footage of Idol singing in large painting frames throughout an apartment. The director made the decision to film Idol from the waist up as he was unable to walk due to injuries from a February 1990 motorcycle crash. The video also features Betsy Lynn George as Devin, a teenager who tries to seduce a modest and mild-mannered businessman (played by Joshua Townshend-Zellner). The film makes use of clips from The Adventures of Ford Fairlane, but as Andrew Dice Clay (who played Fairlane) had been banned from MTV, he is not shown in any of the clips. The video was a huge hit and was placed in heavy rotation on MTV. Idol and George recreated the opening of the video for the 1991 Grammys. An alternative version of the video does not feature the movie's footage, instead depicting a man playing the guitar as heard in the track.

At the 1990 MTV Video Music Awards, the video was nominated for Best Male Video and Best Special Effects and won the award for Best Video from a Film.

This video was voted #33 on VH1's 50 Sexiest Video Moments.

Formats and track listings
7-inch: Chrysalis – IDOL 14 (UK)
 "Cradle of Love" (4:39)
 "311 Man" (3:51)

12-inch: Chrysalis – IDOLX 14 (UK)
 "Cradle of Dub" (extended remix) (6:27)
 "Cradle of Love" (LP version) (4:39) 
 "Rob the Cradle of Dub" (extended mix) (5:07) 
 "311 Man" (3:51)

 Also released as 12-inch picture disc (IDOLXP 14)

CD: Chrysalis – IDOLCD 14 (UK)
 "Cradle of Love" (edit) (4:09)
 "Cradle of Dub" (extended remix)  (6:27)
 "Rob the Cradle of Dub" (extended mix) (5:07) 
 "311 Man" (3:51)

Idol's live performance of the song at the 1991 Grammy Awards was released on the 1994 album Grammy's Greatest Moments Volume I.

Charts

Weekly charts

Year-end charts

Certifications

Cover versions
Alvin and the Chipmunks covered this song as the opening track to their 1991 album The Chipmunks Rock the House. In 1992, "Weird Al" Yankovic included the chorus as the first song in his polka medley "Polka Your Eyes Out" from his album Off the Deep End.

References

External links
 Billy Idol's official site

1990 singles
1990 songs
Billy Idol songs
Chrysalis Records singles
Music videos directed by David Fincher
Songs written by Billy Idol